Loving Couples is a 1964 Swedish drama film directed by Mai Zetterling. It was entered into the 1965 Cannes Film Festival.

Cast
 Harriet Andersson as Agda Frideborg
 Gunnel Lindblom as Adele Holmström - née Silfverstjerna
 Gio Petré as Angela von Pahlen
 Anita Björk as Petra von Pahlen
 Gunnar Björnstrand as Dr. Jacob Lewin
 Eva Dahlbeck as Mrs. Landborg
 Jan Malmsjö as Stellan von Pahlen
 Lissi Alandh as Bell
 Bengt Brunskog as Tord Holmström
 Anja Boman as Stanny, Bernhard's sister
 Åke Grönberg as The fat man
 Margit Carlqvist as Dora Macson
 Heinz Hopf as Lt. Bernhard Landborg
 Märta Dorff as Alexandra Vind-Frija
 Jan-Eric Lindquist as Peter von Pahlen

References

External links
 
 

1964 films
Swedish drama films
1960s Swedish-language films
1964 drama films
Swedish black-and-white films
Films directed by Mai Zetterling
1960s Swedish films